Bethany Mooradian (born December 15, 1975) is an American author, lecturer and internet personality. Her books include the home-based career guide I Got Scammed So You Don't Have To, The Work At Home Training Program, and The Mystery Shopper Training Program.

Career
After graduating from Evergreen State College in Olympia, Washington, Mooradian worked in wide variety of short-lived positions, including a number of jobs as a mystery shopper. She parlayed her experiences into the 2003 book Become a Mystery Shopper. Updated editions were released in 2007 and 2009. In 2011, the book was developed into The Mystery Shopper Training Program and was released by Moreradiant Publishing both as a stand-alone book and as a book/CD-ROM set. Mooradian’s second book, the home-based job-searching guide I Got Scammed So You Don’t Have To was published in 2010 (Moreradiant) with a subsequent revision in 2012. In 2018 Moordian released The Work At Home Training Program 2018 as well as a re-release of The Mystery Shopper Training Program.

Website
In 2004, Mooradian created the "Queen of the Random Job" website. In the years following, the site has spun off to a career-oriented site, WorkAtHomeFAQ.com, and has been publishing regular blog posts since July, 2018.

Lawsuit
From 2002 to 2006, Mooradian taught Mystery Shopping classes through community education centers in the Detroit Metropolitan area using her book, Become a Mystery Shopper as the class textbook. Soon after her move to Seattle in 2006, two of her former students copied Become A Mystery Shopper book to sell as they started teaching similar classes. In February 2009, Mooradian filed a copyright infringement lawsuit in the Michigan Eastern District Court. In July 2011, a judgment was ordered in Mooradian's favor for an undisclosed sum.

Awards 
Mooradian's The Work at Home Training Program 2018 has won a number of book awards since its publication:
 2018 Royal Dragonfly Book Awards – First Place
 Writer’s Digest 2019 Ebook Competition – First Place Overall, Non-Fiction
 San Francisco 2019 Book Awards – First Place, How-To
 Reader’s Views 2018 Book Awards – Second Place, How-To
 Reader’s Favorite 2019 Book Awards – Silver Medal, Non-Fiction Occupational
 Independent Author Network (IAN) 2019 Book Awards – Finalist, Career
Mooradian's The Mystery Shopper Training Program, 2018 has won a number of book awards since its publication:

 2020 Royal Dragonfly Book Awards – First Place, How-To
 2020 Writer's Digest 2020 Ebook Competition - Honorable Mention, Non-Fiction

References

External links
workathomefaq.com

1975 births
Living people
21st-century American women writers
Evergreen State College alumni